Hell Creek Recreation Area is a public recreation area managed by the Little Shell Tribe of Chippewa Indians of Montana occupying  on the south side of Fort Peck Lake  due north of the community of Jordan, Montana. The recreation area sits on the western side of Hell Creek Bay and includes a year-round marina and facilities for water sports, camping, and fishing for walleye, northern pike, and smallmouth bass. The park is managed under a no-cost lease arrangement with the U.S. Army Corps of Engineers. The park has Bortle scale class 1 skies which makes the state park a great place for astronomy as it is far away from light pollution.

References

External links
Hell Creek State Park Montana Fish, Wildlife & Parks
Hell Creek State Park Map Montana Fish, Wildlife & Parks

State parks of Montana
Protected areas of Garfield County, Montana
Protected areas established in 1966
1966 establishments in Montana